The Ukelayat Range is a range of mountains in Kamchatka Krai, Russian Far East. The range is part of the Koryak Highland system  and administratively it belongs to Olyutorsky District.

The name of the range comes from the Koryak "vukvylgayat" (Вуквылгаят), meaning "rock/fall".

Geography
The Ukelayat Range rises above the southern side of the valley of the Ukelayat river. It stretches in a roughly east–west direction with its eastern end close to the Bering Sea, between Dezhnyov Bay and Anastasii Bay. To the south rises the Snegovoy Range and to the north, above the other bank of the Ukelayat river, the Pikas Range.

Flora and fauna
The mountains are covered with mountain tundra, bare rocky areas, dwarf forests and shrub birches. Willow thickets, with diamondleaf willow, feltleaf willow and Salix krylovii, may be found in some of the river valleys.

The Ukelayat Range provides a habitat for the snow sheep.

See also
Bering tundra
List of mountains and hills of Russia

References

External links
The Penzhina-West Kamchatka folded zone and the Ukelayat-Sredinnyi block in the structure of the Koryak Highland and Kamchatka
Mountain - Russia

Koryak Mountains
Landforms of Siberia